The Bloch MB.60, initially known as the MB.VI (continuing the SEA number series), was a tri-motor mailplane designed and built in France from 1930 to 1931 to an order for an aircraft suitable for use as a postal, commercial or medical transport.

Design and development
Marcel bloch formed Société des Avions Marcel Bloch in 1929, the company's first project was the MB.60 3-engined commercial transport aircraft. Built entirely of light alloys with steel for high strength fittings, the MB.60 introduced several new techniques, including rivetting external stringers and longerons to skin sheets before attachment to ribs and frames; delivering a robust light structure that was also easy to manufacture.

Powered by three  Salmson 9AC in the nose of the fuselage and wing mounted nacelles, the sole MB.60 was a high wing cantilever monoplane with wings in three sections, the outer sections having moderate dihedral. The square section fuselage had a constant-section cabin with rear fuselage tapering to the all metal tail unit constructed using the same external stringer method. The undercarriage consisted of tall, strut braced oleo-pneumatic main-legs, attached at the outer engine nacelles, with a light alloy steerable tail-wheel at the end of the fuselage.

A second aircraft, built as the MB.61 powered by three  Lorraine 5Pc, first flew in February 1931. Neither the MB.60 or MB.61 garnered any production orders.

Operational history
Constructed at Buc by a sub-contractor, under close supervision by Bloch and his team, the MB.60 was first flown on 12 September 1930, piloted by René Delmotte. Testing at Buc and Villacoublay revealed satisfactory flight characteristics and performance. 

After a modification programme the MB.61 crashed in April 1931 due to inversion of the controls during re-assembly; after repair the MB.61 continued flight tests from 1 May 1931.

Variants
Data from: Dassault Aviation: MB 60-61: origins, characteristics and performance data
MB.VIInitial designation of the MB.60 at the project stage, powered by three  Salmson 9AC engines;not built.
MB.60 The first prototype, an enlarged version of the MB.VI, powered by three  Salmson 9AC engines; one built.
MB.61 A second aircraft powered by three  Lorraine 5Pc engines; one built.
MB.62 ET4 A four seat military trainer version; not built

Specifications (MB.61)

References

Bloch aircraft
Aircraft first flown in 1930
Three-engined aircraft